Final Breath may refer to:

 "Final Breath", a 2022 song by Meghan Trainor from Takin' It Back
 "Final Breath", a 2018 song by Paloma Faith from The Architect